The Great Mosque of Central Java is a mosque in the city of Semarang, Central Java, Indonesia.

Layout

There are three central buildings arranged in the shape of a U, with the domed mosque at the centre; all buildings have pitched, tiled roofs, while the central mosque has four minarets. The central roof resembles the roof of a "joglo", the traditional Javanese house, and symbolises the rising steps toward heaven or to gain God's blessing. The long buildings forming the arms of the U house a library and auditorium respectively; the auditorium can hold up to 2,000 people.

In the central courtyard are six large hydraulically operated umbrellas, inspired by the ones at Al-Masjid al-Nabawi in Medina, which are used to protect worshipers; the six umbrellas represent the six tenets of iman. More than 15,000 worshipers can fit in the  prayer area. At the open end of the U is a series of Arabic-style arches, with Arabic calligraphs of 99 attributes of Allah, stood on 25 pillars, each representing one of the named prophets in Islam.

Nearby is the  Asmaul Husna Tower, designed to resemble the minaret of Menara Kudus Mosque in Kudus; the height represents the 99 attributes of Allah. Used for calling Muslims to prayer, the tower also houses a radio station for da'wah and museum at its base and restaurant and observation deck near its summit. The upper levels are accessible by lift. On premises there is also a 23-room hotel.

History
Preparations for the mosque's construction began on 6 June 2001, when the governor of Central Java formed the Coordination Team for the Construction of the Great Mosque which consisted of state bodies such as the provincial and city governments as well as private bodies such as the Indonesian Ulema Council (MUI). Of the waqf land once under the purview of the Kauman Mosque of Semarang, only the site at Jl. Gajah was deemed large enough. In September 2001 the team published a proposed construction schedule. Funding came from the provincial government.

Construction began on 6 September 2002, when minister of religion Said Agil Husin al-Munawar, head of MUI Sahal Mahfudz, and governor of Central Java Mardiyanto laid the first stake. While the mosque was still under construction, Chabib Thoha led Friday prayers on 19 March 2004. The mosque was dedicated on 14 November 2006 by President Susilo Bambang Yudhoyono and his wife.

The mosque is also a tourist attraction, with buses and trams available to transport visitors around the grounds.

References
Footnotes

Bibliography

External links

Mosques completed in 2006
Buildings and structures in Semarang
Landmarks in Indonesia
Mosques in Indonesia
Tourist attractions in Central Java